The Montgomery Bowl was a postseason NCAA Division I FBS college football bowl game played in December 2020. Played at the Cramton Bowl in Montgomery, Alabama, the brand is owned and operated by ESPN Events.

The Montgomery Bowl was announced in late October 2020, with organizers indicating that it was a "substitute of the Fenway Bowl for this season only."

Game result

MVP

Appearances by team
Updated through the December 2020 edition (1 game, 2 total appearances).

Appearances by conference
Updated through the December 2020 edition (1 game, 2 total appearances).

Media coverage

Television

Radio

Game records

See also
 Camellia Bowl (2014–present), held at the same venue

References

External links
 Official Site

 
College football bowls
College football bowls in Alabama
Sports in Montgomery, Alabama
2020 establishments in Alabama
2020 in sports in Alabama